Tatiana Ariza Díaz (born 21 February 1991) is a Colombian footballer who plays as a midfielder for Deportivo Cali and the Colombia women's national team.

She was part of the Colombia women's national football team at the 2012 Summer Olympics.  Her twin sister Natalia Ariza is also a footballer.

References

External links 
 

1991 births
Living people
Footballers from Bogotá
Colombian women's footballers
Women's association football midfielders
Austin Peay Lady Govs soccer players
Elpides Karditsas players
Independiente Santa Fe (women) players
Deportivo Cali (women) players
Colombia women's international footballers
2011 FIFA Women's World Cup players
Footballers at the 2012 Summer Olympics
Olympic footballers of Colombia
2015 FIFA Women's World Cup players
Footballers at the 2015 Pan American Games
Pan American Games competitors for Colombia
Footballers at the 2016 Summer Olympics
Colombian expatriate women's footballers
Colombian expatriate sportspeople in the United States
Expatriate women's soccer players in the United States
Colombian expatriate sportspeople in Greece
Expatriate women's footballers in Greece
Twin sportspeople
Colombian twins
Pan American Games silver medalists for Colombia
Medalists at the 2015 Pan American Games
Pan American Games medalists in football
21st-century Colombian women